Kiadtiphon Udom (born 26 June 2000) is a Thai professional footballer who plays as a goalkeeper for Thai League club BG Pathum United.

International career 
On 15 October 2021, Kiadtiphon was called up to the Thailand U23 national team for the 2022 AFC U-23 Asian Cup qualification.

References

External links 
 
 

2000 births
Living people
Kiadtiphon Udom
Kiadtiphon Udom
Kiadtiphon Udom
Association football goalkeepers
Kiadtiphon Udom
Kiadtiphon Udom
Kiadtiphon Udom